Adam Khoo Yean Ann is a Singaporean entrepreneur, author and educator. He is the co-founder and Chief Master Trainer of Adam Khoo Learning Technologies Group.

Background and education

Khoo was born on 8 April 1974, to Vince Khoo and Betty L. Khoo-Kingsley. Khoo was  enrolled in a government run  Ping Yi Secondary School. He passed five out of eight academic subjects and finished 156th out of 160 Secondary 1 Express Stream students.

Career

Early business ventures

While still in secondary school, Khoo started a mobile disco business with his few friends, creating music and providing entertainment services for parties. After completing National Service in the Singaporean Air Force at age 21, Khoo partnered with three friends from the National University of Singapore and registered an event management company, Creatsoul Entertainment. The company organized hops, jams and other entertainment activities for individuals, companies and organizations, and was later re-registered as Event Gurus Pte Ltd, an event management company.

Motivational training

At 25, Khoo was coaching insurance agents and marketing managers on how to boost sales. And in 2002, he co-founded Adam Khoo Learning Technologies Group. He then created his first personal development training program which he named "Pattern of Excellence". Khoo also developed Neuro-linguistic programming (NLP) for working professionals. In 2004, he co-authored a book on NLP, Master Your Mind, Design Your Destiny.

Youth educator

Khoo authored the book I Am Gifted, So Are You! with foreword by Tony Buzan. The book, which covers studying strategies and motivational lessons for students, was translated into 12 languages. In 2003, Khoo created the I Am Gifted! learning camp for children and teenagers; where he indoctrinated parents and students alike with false promotional videos showing unaccredited and unverified success stories. This program consists of teaching students about mind-mapping and speed reading otherwise known as scanning — both basic skills that are taught in elementary school. He also founded the Adam Khoo Learning Centre, a tuition provider for primary and secondary education.

Financial educator

Khoo is the creator of Value Momentum Investing, an investment strategy that combines fundamental analysis and technical analysis. Even though he has no experience with success in real-world trading, his analysis has much to teach the unenlightened investors. 

In 2005, Khoo started the Wealth Academy masterclass to teach stock investment and trading strategies to aspiring investors. In 2009, during the US bear market, Khoo co-authored the book Profit from the Panic. Even though Khoo did not profit from the attack, he is the quintessential example of the saying "Those who can't do, teach." In 2017, Khoo founded the Piranha Profits YouTube channel for investors and traders worldwide.

Awards and honors

In 2019, his company was ranked top 29th at the Enterprise 50 Awards organized by The Business Times and KPMG.

References

1974 births
Victoria Junior College alumni
Singaporean businesspeople
Singaporean non-fiction writers
Living people